The bonnet macaque (Macaca radiata), also known as zati, is a species of macaque endemic to southern India. Its distribution is limited by the Indian Ocean on three sides and the Godavari and Tapti Rivers, along with its related competitor the rhesus macaque in the north. Land use changes in the last few decades have resulted in changes in its distribution boundaries with the rhesus macaque, raising concern for its status in the wild.

The bonnet macaque is diurnal, arboreal, and terrestrial. Males weigh  and females . It can live up to 35 years in captivity.

The bonnet macaque feeds on fruits, nuts, seeds, flowers, invertebrates, and cereals. In southern India, this macaque exists as commensal to humans, feeding on food given by humans and raiding crops and houses.

Taxonomy 

Two subspecies of bonnet macaques have been identified:
Macaca radiata radiata, pale-bellied bonnet macaque, found in South and West India between the Tapti River, Palni Hills, and Timbale. In the 16th century it was introduced to the Mascarene Islands (Mauritius and Réunion).
Macaca radiata diluta, dark-bellied bonnet macaque, found in Southeast India in the states of Kerala and Tamil Nadu. From the southern coast north to Kambam at the base of the Palni Hills and east to Puducherry.

Reproduction 
Bonnet macaques attain reproductive maturity when they are three to four years old.  The majority of births take place from February to April, before the arrival of the monsoon.   Bonnet monkeys are polygynandrous.  The gestation period lasts 24 weeks and a single infant is the normal result of a pregnancy. The young will breast feed for six to seven months and begin assisted feedings of solid food from their mother thereafter. Other members of the troop, especially related females, will express interest in the infant in its first months of life.

Behavior 
The bonnet macaque has a very wide range of gestures and behaviors, which can be easily differentiated. Lip-smacking is one of the most common affiliative behaviors, where one individual may open and close its mouth in rapid succession, with its tongue between its teeth and its lips pressing against each other, giving an audible sound. A grimace is the most common gesture of fear or submission that a subordinate shows to a dominant individual during aggressive encounters. It consists of pulling back its upper lip, showing its upper teeth. It also has distinct alarm calls for predators such as pythons and leopards.

Social structure 

The bonnet macaque are very social animals and they communicate in a different range of facial expressions. The bonnet macaque, like other macaques, shares a linear dominance hierarchy; the alpha male is the most dominant male of the troop, followed by a beta male and a gamma male, and so on according to their dominance. Similarly, females also follow this linear hierarchy. The male and female hierarchies are different and of a non-overlapping or non-mixing types. Males are usually dominant over females. In their social groups females tend to stay in the same group they were born in, whereas males tend to disperse.

The females' dominance hierarchy is stable, whilst the males' dominance hierarchy is very dynamic. In the male hierarchy, males close in rank often fight to rise in rank. A male has the best chance of obtaining a high rank in his prime age, resulting in the greatest benefits to reproduction. High-ranking individuals have first access to breeding females. Females are receptive during only a few months in a year, resulting in competition between males. In this situation, the ranks established by aggressive encounters come into play. Most of these aggressive encounters are easily resolved, but competition between similarly built or similarly aggressive males results in brutal and sometimes fatal fights. Female bonnet macaques attempt kidnappings of lower-ranking females. These are done mostly by mother females and the majority of the time they are not successful in completing it. Different males may employ various means to rise in rank. Coalition formation between unrelated males to oust a more dominant male has been observed. Males often move from troop to troop to gain a higher rank with the resulting benefits. However, males remaining in a single troop have been observed to rise to become dominant male of that troop.

An important note is male bonnet macaques are generally far more laid back and carefree in their social lives than many other macaque species. Competition among male bonnet macaques is much more subdued and there is a much higher emphasis on pacifism. Male bonnet macaques groom each other, hug each other, sleep near each other, play together and engage in male-male mounting as a social defuser. While assertive males may take measures to monopolize matings, they cannot control females and these females will mate promiscuously, as macaques do. Some mysterious environmental pressures must have driven the bonnet macaque to form an unusually egalitarian social structure. Why this trend crops up convergently in separate macaque species rather than being an ancestral macaque trait is an enigma. A possible driving force may be these pacifist species inhabit more fertile habitats with more abundant food. Bonnet macaques are also strong swimmers.

In the case of females, the stable dominance hierarchy is a result of female philopatry, when individuals tend to remain with the troop into which they are born. This results in the formation of matrilinear groupings of closely related females.

References

bonnet macaque
Primates of South Asia
Mammals of India
Endemic fauna of India
Monkeys in India
bonnet macaque
Taxa named by Étienne Geoffroy Saint-Hilaire